Nowhatta, known as Navyut in Kashmiri, is a town of historical importance situated at a distance of 5 km from Lal Chowk, Srinagar in Jammu and Kashmir, India. Nowhatta is famous because of Historical Mosque known as Jamia Masjid.
Nowhatta area has eighteen sub-communities Mohalla. The place is also notable for high rate of stone pelting incidents in Kashmir. Each week after Friday prayers, people stage their protest against Indian rule which most of the times results in stone pelting incidents in the area.

History
Historically it has been the centre of various Islamic Universities during the period of Sultans.
There are various shrines located in this area
Ziyarat Naqshband Sahab
Ziyarat Baha-ud-din Ganj Baksh
Ziyarat Makdhoom Sahab
Ziyarat Syed Hasari Sahab

Also located in the vicinity of this area is Martyrs Graveyard of 13 July 1931 martyrs, who fell to bullets of Dogra soldiers.

Geography
It has an average elevation of 1,568 metres (5,144 feet) above mean sea level.

The mountain, Hari Parbat, with historic significance is near and clearly visible form here.

See also
 Hazratbal

References

 

 Cities and towns in Srinagar district
 Neighbourhoods in Srinagar